Muhammad Hambali Tolib (born 20 June 2000) is an Indonesian professional footballer who plays as a midfielder for Liga 1 club Borneo, on loan from PSS Sleman.

Club career

Sriwijaya
In 2018, Hambali signed a year contract with Sriwijaya. He made 6 matches without scoring, when Sriwijaya played in the Liga 1.

Persela Lamongan
In 2019, Hambali signed a year contract with Persela Lamongan. He made his debut on 17 May 2019 in a match against Madura United. On 27 May 2019, Hambali scored his first goal for Persela against Arema in the 26th minute at the Kanjuruhan Stadium, Malang.

Persebaya Surabaya
He was signed for Persebaya Surabaya to play in Liga 1 in the 2020 season. He made his league debut for Persebaya on 29 February 2020 in a draw 1–1 against Persik Kediri. And a month later, This season was suspended on 27 March 2020 due to the COVID-19 pandemic. The season was abandoned and was declared void on 20 January 2021.

PSS Sleman
Hambali was signed for PSS Sleman to play in Liga 1 in the 2022–23 season.

Borneo Samarinda (loan)
He was signed for Boneo Samarinda to play in Liga 1 in the 2022 season, on loan from PSS Sleman. Hambali made his league debut on 30 July 2022 in a match against Barito Putera at the Demang Lehman Stadium, Martapura.

International career
He made his international debut for Indonesia U-23 on 7 June 2019 against Thailand U-23 and Philippines U-23 on 9 June 2019 at 2019 Merlion Cup.

Career statistics

Club

Honours

Club
Persebaya Surabaya
 East Java Governor Cup: 2020

References

External links
 Hambali Tolib at Soccerway
 Hambali Tolib at Liga Indonesia

2000 births
Living people
Sportspeople from Makassar
Sportspeople from South Sulawesi
Indonesian footballers
Liga 1 (Indonesia) players
Sriwijaya F.C. players
Persela Lamongan players
Persebaya Surabaya players
PSS Sleman players
Borneo F.C. players
Association football midfielders
Indonesia youth international footballers